Laksevåg Church is a parish church of the Church of Norway in Bergen Municipality in Vestland county, Norway. It is located in the borough of Laksevåg in the city of Bergen. It is the church for the Laksevåg parish which is part of the Bergen domprosti (arch-deanery) in the Diocese of Bjørgvin. The white, wooden church was built in a long church design in 1875 using plans drawn up by the architects Peter Andreas Blix and Theodor August Fromholz. The church seats about 432 people.

History
In the early 1870s, plans were made for a new church in Laksevåg. It was built on the basis of architectural drawings by Peter Andreas Blix which was edited by another architect, Theodor August Fromholz. The lead builder for the project was Askild Aase. The church was built in 1874-1875 and it was consecrated on 12 May 1875. In 1885, a second sacristy was built on the west side of the choir. From 1915-1935, the church was rebuilt and expanded in several stages. During the construction work, the church was given more of a Neo Baroque architectural style. This work was planned first by Georg Greve (until 1927), and later by Thorolf Hals-Frølich. In 1993, a wing to the north was constructed to add more space in the church.

Media gallery

See also
List of churches in Bjørgvin

References

Churches in Bergen
Long churches in Norway
Wooden churches in Norway
19th-century Church of Norway church buildings
Churches completed in 1875
1875 establishments in Norway